The 2006 Women's Hockey World Cup was the 11th edition of the Women's Hockey World Cup field hockey tournament. It was held from 27 September to 8 October 2006 in Madrid, Spain.

The Netherlands won the tournament for the sixth time after defeating Australia 3–1 in the final. Defending champions Argentina won the third place match by defeating Spain 5–0.

Qualification
Each of the continental champions from five federations and the host nation received an automatic berth. The European federation received one extra quota based upon the FIH World Rankings. Alongside the five teams qualifying through the Qualifier, twelve teams competed in this tournament.

Squads

Umpires
Below are the 14 umpires appointed by the International Hockey Federation:

Chieko Akiyama (JPN)
Julie Ashton-Lucy (AUS)
Caroline Brunekreef (NED)
Ute Conen (GER)
Marelize de Klerk (RSA)
Carolina de la Fuente (ARG)
Jean Duncan (SCO)
Sarah Garnett (NZL)
Soledad Iparraguirre (ARG)
Anne McRae (SCO)
Miao Lin (CHN)
Gina Spitaleri (ITA)
Minka Woolley (AUS)
Kazuko Yasueda (JPN)

Results
All times are Central European Summer Time (UTC+02:00)

First round

Pool A

Pool B

Ninth to twelfth place classification

Crossover

Eleventh and twelfth place

Ninth and tenth place

Fifth to eighth place classification

Crossover

Seventh and eighth place

Fifth and sixth place

First to fourth place classification

Semifinals

Third and fourth place

Final

Awards

Statistics

Final standings

Goalscorers

References

External links
Official FIH website
Official website

 
Women's Hockey World Cup
World Cup
International women's field hockey competitions hosted by Spain
Hockey World Cup
Sports competitions in Madrid
Hockey World Cup Women
Hockey World Cup Women
2006 in Madrid